In the 17th century, the Quaker movement adopted the use of the word epistle following the example of its use in the New Testament. A Quaker epistle is an advisory or admonitory letter sent to a group of people; such a letter is sometimes termed a "general epistle". Epistles continue to be sent by Yearly Meetings in session to all other Yearly Meetings.

See also 
 Book of Discipline (Quaker)

Notes

References

Further reading 
 "To Friends everywhere" : reflections on the epistle in the life of London Yearly Meeting" by Edward H. Milligan. - In: The Friends' quarterly ; Vol.22 ; no.11 (July 1982 ) p. 724-736.
 "Epistles in context: London Yearly Meeting in the nineteenth century" by Peggy Heeks - In Friends quarterly; Vol. 40; No. 3 (August 2012) pp. 12–23.
 "Written epistles of London Yearly Meeting in the eighteenth century" by David J. Hall in A Quaker miscellany for Edward H. Milligan, edited by David Blamires, Jeremy Greenwood and Alex Kerr, published by David Blamires (1985) . pp. 91 – 99.

External links 
 Epistles from Yearly Meetings of Friends around the world, 2012 to present
 Epistles in English from Yearly Meetings in the Americas
 Epistles in Spanish from Yearly Meetings in the Americas/Epístolas de las Juntas Anuales

Quaker practices
Christian literary genres